Yasemin Begüm Dalgalar (born 8 June 1988) is a Turkish female basketball player for Adana ASKİ in the Power forward position.

She started her career at Fenerbahçe of İstanbul in 1998 in youth level, and continued in senior level between 2005–2011.
She played for Tarsus Belediyespor in the 2011–2012 season before moving to her current team Kayseri Kaski in the 2012–2013 season.

As of July 2012, she has 105 appearances for Turkey women's national basketball team.

She has been in the rooster of the Turkey women's national basketball team that ranked 5th at the 2012 Summer Olympics.

Honors
Turkish Championship
Winners (6): 2006, 2007, 2008, 2009, 2010, 2011
Turkish Cup
Winners (4): 2006, 2007, 2008, 2009
Turkish Presidents Cup
Winners (2): 2007, 2010

See also
 Turkish women in sports

References

External links
Player profile at fenerbahce.org

1988 births
Living people
Basketball players from Istanbul
Turkish women's basketball players
Fenerbahçe women's basketball players
Power forwards (basketball)
Basketball players at the 2012 Summer Olympics
Olympic basketball players of Turkey
Abdullah Gül Üniversitesi basketball players